John Sharp Williams (July 30, 1854September 27, 1932) was a prominent American politician in the Democratic Party from the 1890s through the 1920s, and served as the Minority Leader of the United States House of Representatives from 1903 to 1908.

Early life
Williams was born in Memphis, Tennessee, but raised in Yazoo County, Mississippi, after he was orphaned during the American Civil War. After graduating from the Kentucky Military Institute in 1870, he studied at the University of the South before transferring to the University of Virginia, Charlottesville, where he was Phi Beta Kappa but did not complete all his science courses for his bachelor's degree. He spent two years in Europe at the University of Heidelberg and what is now the University of Burgundy before returning to the University of Virginia to receive his law degree in 1876. After a brief return to Memphis (where he married Elizabeth Dial Webb in 1877), Williams returned to Yazoo County, where from 1878 to 1893 he ran the family plantation and kept a law practice.

Political career
Elected to the United States House of Representatives in 1893, Williams soon became a leader of the Democratic minority, renowned for his speaking skill and wit. Like most other Southern Democrats of the day, he was a proponent of coining silver and an opponent of high tariffs. In 1906, when Great Britain launched HMS Dreadnought, Congressman Williams introduced a bill to change the name of USS Michigan to USS Skeered O' Nothin' as a challenge to the prestigious English.

During his time as ranking Democrat in the Republican-controlled House, Williams was given the privilege of choosing the Democrats assigned to committees by the House Speaker Joseph Gurney Cannon (by the rules of the House, Cannon was entitled to make all appointments himself), giving him tremendous power within the minority party. In gratitude, Williams was known to omit Democrats whom Cannon found particularly objectionable from committee assignments. Recognizing his status vis-à-vis Cannon, Williams jokingly described his relative political impotence in the Cannon-dominated Committee on Rules, "I am invited to the seances but I am never consulted about the spiritualistic appearances."

By beating one of Mississippi's leading racebaiters, James K. Vardaman, Williams moved to the United States Senate in 1911 after an early election on 21 January 1908. He became one of Woodrow Wilson's strongest supporters, from Wilson's nomination for the Presidency in 1912 to the losing battle to ratify American participation in the League of Nations in 1920. During his time as a senator, he also served as a chairman of the Committee to Establish a University of the United States.

He made a notorious denunciation of the black race when he declared on December 20, 1898: "You could ship-wreck 10,000 illiterate white Americans on a desert island, and in three weeks they would have a fairly good government, conceived and administered upon fairly democratic lines. You could ship-wreck 10,000 negroes, every one of whom was a graduate of Harvard University, and in less than three years, they would have retrograded governmentally; half of the men would have been killed, and the other half would have two wives apiece."

After retiring from the Senate in 1923, Williams returned to his family plantation, where he spent the last decade of his life, dying in late 1932.

References
 https://bbhosted.cuny.edu/bbcswebdav/pid-21382929-dt-content-rid-108032078_1/courses/CTY01_ART_10000_R_1159_1/Masur.pdf

External links

 The John Sharp Williams Collection (MUM00480) can be found at the University of Mississippi, Archive and Special Collections
 

1854 births
1932 deaths
20th-century American politicians
Democratic Party members of the United States House of Representatives from Mississippi
Democratic Party United States senators from Mississippi
Minority leaders of the United States House of Representatives
People from Yazoo County, Mississippi
Politicians from Memphis, Tennessee
Candidates in the 1904 United States presidential election
University of Virginia alumni
20th-century American lawyers
19th-century American lawyers
19th-century American politicians
Mississippi lawyers
Heidelberg University alumni
Sewanee: The University of the South alumni